Monoloxis cinerascens is a species of snout moth, and the type species in the genus Monoloxis. It was described by Warren in 1891, and is known from Brazil.

References

Moths described in 1891
Chrysauginae